The Nittany Lion is the eastern mountain lion mascot of the athletic teams of the Pennsylvania State University: Penn State Nittany Lions. Created in 1907, the "Nittany" forename refers to the local Mount Nittany, which overlooks the university.

History 

The Nittany Lion is the mascot of the Penn State Nittany Lions—the athletic teams of the Pennsylvania State University, located in University Park, Pennsylvania, USA. It is an eastern mountain lion, the "Nittany" forename referring to the local Mount Nittany, which overlooks the university.

The mascot was the creation of Penn State senior H. D. "Joe" Mason in 1904. While on a trip to Princeton University, Mason had been embarrassed that Penn State did not have a mascot. Mason did not let that deter him: he fabricated the Nittany Lion on the spot and proclaimed that it would easily defeat the Princeton Bengal tiger. The Lion's primary means of attack against the Tiger would be its strong right arm, capable of slaying any foes (this is now traditionally exemplified through cumulative one-armed push-ups after the team scores a touchdown). Upon returning to campus, he set about making his invention a reality. In 1907, he wrote in the student publication The Lemon:

Historicity 
Eastern mountain lions had roamed on nearby Mount Nittany until the 1880s. The origin of the name "Mount Nittany" is obscure, the most commonly accepted explanation being that it is derived of Native American words (loosely pronounced as "neet-a-nee"), named after the subspecies of cougars that roamed the mountain, or "single mountain"—a protective barrier against the elements. The "original" Nittany Lion can be seen in the Penn State All-Sports Museum. It was killed in Susquehanna County by Samuel Brush in 1856. According to a July 1992 article in National Geographic by Maurice Hornocker titled "Learning to Live with Mountain Lions", "Courthouse records from Centre County, Pennsylvania, show that one local hunter killed 64 lions between 1820 and 1845. During those 25 years an estimated 600 cats were killed in that county alone."

Theme song 

In the early 1920s, a song was created to honor the mascot. It is played during sporting events on campus entitled "The Nittany Lion". Many fans know this song as "Hail to the Lion," even though that is not technically the name of the song.

See also
 Sports mascots
 Nittany Lion Shrine
 Penn State Nittany Lions
 The Pennsylvania State University

References

External links
 Nittany Lion Mascots 
 Esposito, Jackie R. and Steven L. Herb. The Nittany Lion, Penn State Press, 2001 

Big Ten Conference mascots
Penn State Nittany Lions
Pennsylvania State University
Fictional mountain lions